Jerry S. Rawls Hall is a building on the Purdue University campus, Krannert School of Management. The building is named after Jerry S. Rawls, a Krannert alumnus, who donated $10 million toward its construction.  Rawls was formerly the chief executive officer of Finisar Corp.  The building is connected to the Krannert building via an above ground walkway.

The , four story, $37 million state-of-the-art building houses 13 electronically equipped classrooms, a multimedia-based auditorium, 25 breakout rooms, distance learning facilities, sophisticated computer labs and a professional career center. It opened for classes in August 2003 and was formally dedicated in October of that year.

External links 
 Krannert School of Management - Rawls Hall Home

School buildings completed in 2003
Purdue University campus
Krannert School of Management
2003 establishments in Indiana